Ewoud Sanders (born 24 March 1958) is a Dutch historian of the Dutch language and a journalist. He is associated with the Museum Meermanno in The Hague, and is best known to the general public from his regular weekly column WoordHoek ("Word Corner") in the newspaper NRC Handelsblad.

His newspaper articles relate to the history of Dutch words and expressions; but also include scholarly studies of people such as the Dutch lexicographer Johan Hendrik van Dale.

Sanders uses both his own expert knowledge and his skill in internet searching to prepare his publications. In 2009, he gave the 18th  memorial lecture on the latter topic, under the title De reïncarnatie van het boek. In zeven stappen een eigen digitale bibliotheek ("The Reincarnation of the Book. Seven Steps Towards a Digital Library"), which was published by Leiden University Press.

His interests include the improvement of digital access to printed Dutch language sources, such as newspapers, books and magazines. His 2011 pamphlet Eerste Hulp Bij e-Onderzoek ("First Aid for e-Research") (which has been reprinted) has been distributed free of charge to students by several institutes of higher learning in the Netherlands. In 2015, Google gave him a grant of $15,000 towards the improvement of internet searching in that country.

Sanders has asserted, in his doctoral dissertation for Radboud University Nijmegen, that several modern Christian books for children include antisemitic themes; and has said that he disapproved of their doing so.

Publications 
See:
 
 :nl:Ewoud Sanders, for a list in the corresponding article in Dutch Wikipedia

References

External links
 
  Personal website.

1958 births
Date of birth missing (living people)
Place of birth missing (living people)
Living people
Dutch lexicographers
Dutch journalists